Major-General Cecil William Park   (19 June 1885 – 29 March 1913) was a British Army officer.

Military career
Educated at Haileybury, Park was commissioned into the British Army in 1875. After seeing action in the Second Anglo-Afghan War in 1879, he became commanding officer of the 1st Battalion the Devonshire Regiment and was deployed to South Africa in 1899 during the Second Boer War. His battalion's charge on the boers on Waggon Hill on 6 January 1900 during the Relief of Ladysmith was described as "the crowning episode of the day".

He became assistant adjutant-general for South Eastern District in 1902, deputy adjutant-general in India in July 1903 and commandant of the Nasirabad Brigade in January 1906. His last post was as General Officer Commanding East Lancashire Division in October 1910 before his death in command of his division on 29 March 1913.

References

Sources

1885 births
1913 deaths
Companions of the Order of the Bath
British Army major generals
Devonshire Regiment officers
People educated at Haileybury and Imperial Service College
British Army personnel of the Second Boer War
British military personnel of the Second Anglo-Afghan War